Obereoides antennatus is a species of beetle in the family Cerambycidae. It was described by Martins and Galileo in 2003. It is known from Bolivia.

References

Forsteriini
Beetles described in 2003